Middle Eastern hip hop is hip hop music and culture originating in the Middle East.  It is performed in many languages such as English, local Arabic dialects, Hebrew, Persian, and French. It is highly influenced by American hip hop.

Arab hip hop

Arabic hip-hop refers to hip-hop developed in the Arab world. It is heavily influenced by American hip-hop, although it also fuses many aspects of local poetic traditions and culture. Common themes include social and political realities, such as poverty, drug use, and resistance to occupation. Hip-hop played an important role during the Arab Spring as a rallying chant for protesters.

Iranian hip hop 

Iranian hip-hop, also known as Persian hip-hop, refers to hip-hop developed in Iran. Due to government repression, a large portion of the Iranian hip-hop scene lies underground.

Israeli hip hop 

Israeli hip-hop refers to hip-hop developed in Israel. Unlike hip-hop in other parts of the Middle East, Israeli hip-hop is not controlled by the government. Although some inspiration is taken from American hip-hop, hip-hop in Israel usually deals with situations in their countries, addressing issues such as poverty, criminality, and the Israeli-Palestinian Conflict.

References

External links
 https://flypaper.soundfly.com/discover/powerful-arab-hip-hop-artists-middle-east/

Hip hop
Hip hop
Hip hop by continent